The Mercury Summer Theatre of the Air (1946) is a CBS radio drama series produced, directed by and starring Orson Welles. It was a short-lived summer radio series sponsored by Pabst Blue Ribbon, on Friday evenings at 10 p.m. ET lasting 15 episodes. It harked back to Welles's earlier The Mercury Theatre on the Air (1938) and its successor, The Campbell Playhouse, but was not able to replicate its success. The series offered 30-minute adaptations of classic plays and novels, plus some adaptations of popular motion pictures, whereas the original had offered more depth in its 60-minute running time. Although the Mercury Theatre troupe had disbanded when Welles was fired from RKO studios in 1942 and the Mercury players were dismissed with him, this radio series offered a reunion of many Mercury personnel, including Richard Wilson (who would direct the rehearsals) and composer Bernard Herrmann, as well as familiar actors such as Agnes Moorehead and William Alland.

Wider significance
The first episode is of particular note. At the time, Welles was directing Around the World on Broadway, a critically acclaimed musical based on Around the World in Eighty Days, which was praised by Bertolt Brecht as being the greatest night at the theatre he had ever experienced. Nonetheless, the expensive production flopped, and in a bid to give it publicity, Welles broadcast a half-hour condensation of the musical. The episode was the only recording ever made of any part of the musical or its Cole Porter score. 

Welles had created, directed and starred in a string of radio drama series since 1937, and The Mercury Summer Theatre of the Air in 1946 ended up being his last. He moved to Europe in the fall of 1947, and his later radio work was made in Britain, most notably The Adventures of Harry Lime (1951–52). By the time Welles moved back to the US in 1956–58, and again more permanently in the 1970s, radio was no longer the dominant force it had been in the 1930s and 1940s.

As with many other Old Time Radio series from the period, the episodes have now lapsed into the public domain.

Episodes

See also
 Orson Welles radio credits
 Mercury Theatre
 The Mercury Theatre on the Air
 Campbell Playhouse

References

External links
 Mercury Summer Theatre episodes, Part 1 - available for download at archive.org (all in the public domain)
 Mercury Summer Theatre episodes, Part 2 - available for download at archive.org (all in the public domain)

American radio dramas
1946 radio programme debuts
1946 radio programme endings
1940s American radio programs
Anthology radio series
CBS Radio programs
Works by Orson Welles

fi:The Campbell Playhouse